Katriana Sandra Huguet (born July 29, 1990), better known by her stage name Kat Dahlia (formerly Kat Hue), is a Cuban-American recording artist. Born and raised in Miami, Florida, Dahlia is a singer, songwriter and rapper, known for her "razor sharp" lyrics and her "unique, aggressive flow". She released her debut single "Gangsta", in March 2013, to rave reviews. Dahlia released her debut studio album My Garden, in January 2015, with Vested in Culture and Epic Records, the latter of which she secured a recording contract with in 2012. In 2013, Dahlia ranked number eight on Billboard's "Next Big Sound".

Early life
Kat Dahlia was born Katriana Sandra Huguet on July 29, 1990, to a Cuban mother and her Lebanese-Cuban father, in Miami Beach, Florida. She began rapping at the age of eight and writing songs at the age of 15, ripping instrumentals from YouTube, in lieu of a band. At the age of 18, after saving money from jobs as a waitress, Dahlia decided to leave Miami, and moved to New York City a month later, "on a whim." Thereafter, Dahlia became involved in what she describes as a "toxic relationship", which she would later come to regard as a source of inspiration and "writer's gold." She chose the name Kat Dahlia as her stage name after her producer suggested it and kept it, because its soft and beautiful, but still has a dark undertone to it.

Musical career
After self-financing an extended play (EP) and a music video, Dahlia was discovered by Vested in Culture VP of A&R Amanda Berkowitz. Berkowitz quickly brought Dahlia to the attention of veteran record executive Sylvia Rhone. In 2012, describing Dahlia as "more than just a pop artist", Rhone signed her to her newly launched label, Vested in Culture (VIC), a joint venture with Epic Records. Dahlia's debut album was originally set to come out in 2014, becoming VIC's inaugural release.

Dahlia's first single and video for VIC, was the track "Gangsta", which MTV called "filled to the brim with fierce rapping". The video, filmed in Miami, reflects the difficulties of her earlier life. The video was directed by Samantha Lecca and premiered via Vevo, on March 5, 2013. Also in March, Dahlia was selected as a BET "Music Matters" artist. "Gangsta" was featured in the background of the September 24, 2014 Season 16 Premiere of Law & Order: Special Victims Unit, Girls Disappeared.

Dahlia digitally released three songs, "Gangsta", "Money Party", and "Mirror" on March 5, 2013. On December 17, 2013, she released her song "Crazy" for free on her website. Her debut My Garden was released on January 15, 2015. The album debuted at number 54 on the US Billboard 200 chart. My Garden received generally positive reviews from music critics. At Metacritic, which assigns a normalized rating out of 100 to reviews from critics, the album received an average score of 63, which indicates "generally favorable reviews", based on four reviews.

Kat Dahlia released her third EP, titled 20s, 50s, 100s, via SoundCloud on May 9, 2016, which features three songs, "Run It Up", "Voices in My Head" and "Lion".

In May 2017, Dahlia released the song "Friday Night Majic", which was intended as the lead single from her planned second studio album, Naked Lady and a White Horse. The album was produced by J Roc and originally scheduled to be released in July 2017, but did not eventuate. On July 21, 2017, Dahlia released the single "Body and Soul" to all streaming platforms and also uploaded a lyric video to her YouTube Vevo channel.

On May 4, 2018, after creating his For the Culture Playlist, which included Miguel's single "Come Through and Chill", Salaam Remi released the EP South Beach Social Club, a collaboration with Dahlia.

Artistry
Dahlia's musical style has been described as being "razor sharp" lyrics and her unique, aggressive flow. Dhalia sings and raps in both English and Spanish. Dahlia cites artists Christina Aguilera, BB King, Miles Davis, Led Zeppelin, The Doors, Bob Marley, Frank Sinatra, and Celia Cruz as musical influences. Also, in interviews, Dahlia has mentioned that legendary reggae recording artist Bob Marley, has had a great influence on her musical style. She has said: "I listened to a lot of Bob Marley, especially down here. I used to go to Purdy Lounge on Monday night, they always had reggae bands. Reggae is just everywhere down here, dancehall is everywhere in the clubs. It's not only playing Hip Hop."

Discography

Studio albums

EPs

Mixtapes

Singles

Guest appearances

Music videos

References

External links
 
 
 
 
 

Epic Records artists
American women rappers
1990 births
Living people
American women hip hop singers
American women hip hop musicians
American women singer-songwriters
21st-century American singers
American people of Cuban descent
Spanish-language singers of the United States
Hispanic and Latino American rappers
Rappers from Miami
American people of Lebanese descent
Women in Latin music
Cuban women rappers
21st-century American rappers
21st-century women rappers
21st-century American women singers
Singer-songwriters from Florida